Sabine Fischer (born June 29, 1973 in Menznau) is a Swiss long-distance runner.

Achievements

References

External links
 

1973 births
Living people
People from Willisau District
Swiss female middle-distance runners
Swiss female long-distance runners
Athletes (track and field) at the 2000 Summer Olympics
Olympic athletes of Switzerland
Universiade medalists in athletics (track and field)
Universiade bronze medalists for Switzerland
Medalists at the 2001 Summer Universiade
Sportspeople from the canton of Lucerne